(born 2 October 1984 in Saitama, Japan) is a Japanese rugby union player. Fujita has played 14 matches for the Japan national rugby union team.

Fujita was a member of the Japan team at the 2011 Rugby World Cup, where he played four matches.

Fujita currently plays for Top League team Honda Heat.

References

Living people
1984 births
Japanese rugby union players
Mie Honda Heat players
Japan international rugby union players
Rugby union props